Hans Hollenstein (born 1 April 1929) is a Swiss former racing cyclist. He was the Swiss National Road Race champion in 1957.

References

External links
 

1929 births
Living people
Swiss male cyclists
Cyclists from Zürich
Tour de Suisse stage winners